Dar Afshan (also Romanized as Dār Āfshān; also known as Dārūn) is a village in Golestan Rural District, in the Central District of Falavarjan County, Isfahan Province, Iran. At the 2006 census, its population was 1,006, comprising some 260 families.

References 

Populated places in Falavarjan County